Mirror, Mirror is a 1979 American made-for-television drama film which explores the world of cosmetic surgery. Directed by Joanna Lee, the film stars Janet Leigh, Lee Meriwether, Loretta Swit, Robert Vaughn, Peter Bonerz and originally aired on NBC on October 10, 1979.

Plot
Three women – Millie Gorman, Sandy McLaren and Vanessa Wagner – are having problems in their lives which they believe plastic surgery can solve. Millie is a wealthy widow convinced that her sex appeal has waned along with her looks and youth; Sandy is a bored housewife whose husband regards her more as a friend than a lover; and ex-model Vanessa, who now owns a modeling agency, fears the years showing on her face will ruin any chance she has of reuniting with a former lover.

Eventually, Sandy gets breast implants which have the opposite of the desired effect on her husband; Vanessa gets an eye-lift, only to find out her ex-lover wasn't worth the trouble; and Millie, in desperation to look younger and more attractive to men, puts her life in jeopardy when she has a face-lift despite her doctor's warnings.

Cast
Janet Leigh as Millie Gorman
Lee Meriwether as Vanessa Wagner
Loretta Swit as Sandy McLaren
Robert Vaughn as Michael Jacoby
Peter Bonerz as Andrew McLaren
Robin Mattson as Pamela Gorman
Walter Brooke as Dr. Samuel Shaw

References
Mirror, Mirror: Vanity Fare on NBC at The Washington Post
 Janet Leigh: A Biography. Capua, Michelangelo. p. 209-210

External links

1979 films
1979 television films
1979 drama films
NBC network original films
Works about plastic surgery
American drama television films
1970s American films